Shenyun station is a Metro station of Shenzhen Metro Line 7. It opened on 28 October 2016.

Station layout

The center track is used for a staff-only shuttle which leads to the staff-only Wenti Park station in the depot, and is operated with a special 3-car train instead of the typical 6-car trains.

Exits

References

External links
 Shenzhen Metro Shenyun Station (Chinese)
 Shenzhen Metro Shenyun Station (English)

Shenzhen Metro stations
Railway stations in Guangdong
Futian District
Railway stations in China opened in 2011